Operation Mata Hari (Spanish: Operación Mata Hari) is a 1968 Spanish comedy film directed by Mariano Ozores and starring Gracita Morales, José Luis López Vázquez and Antonio Ozores. It is based on the story of the German spy Mata Hari's activities during the First World War.

Partial cast
 Gracita Morales as Guillermina Retuerto / Falsa Mata-Hari 
 José Luis López Vázquez as Coronel Von Faber 
 Antonio Ozores as Williso 
 Pilar Velázquez as Paula 
 Margot Cottens as Agripina 
 José Luis Coll as Vorochenko 
 José Sacristán as Jean-Paul 
 Pedro Porcel as General Kloch  
 María Isbert as Prostitute nº 6  
 Goyo Lebrero as Ally Spy
 Carmen de Lirio as Mata-Hari

References

Bibliography 
 Mira, Alberto. The A to Z of Spanish Cinema. Rowman & Littlefield, 2010.

External links 
 

Spanish historical comedy films
1968 films
1960s spy comedy films
1960s Spanish-language films
Films directed by Mariano Ozores
Spanish spy comedy films
World War I spy films
1960s historical comedy films
1960s Spanish films